Pouya Saraei is an Iranian composer, music arranger, conductor, lecturer, music critic, researcher, and santour instrumentalist.

Biography 
He started playing the santour at the age of seven and some of his music masters were: Javad Bathaie, Faramarz Payvar, Hossein Alizadeh, Pashang Kamkar, Dariush Talai, Mostafa Kamal Pourtorab, Hassan Riahi, Sharif Lotfi, Farid Omran, Majid Derakhshani, Mohammad-Reza Lotfi.

He played the santour in the first track of the Modes album, composed by Karen Keyhani that was published by Navona Records.  Also he has played Santour in over 220 Albums and other musical projects with various composers and vocalists of Iran. Another Work was "In the name of the red rose" project (Concerts and Albums) with Dastan Ensemble, vocaled by Salar Aghili. He had several concerts in Europe Tour as a santour player in Simorq musical project, conducted by Hooman Khalatbari, vocaled by Homayoun Shajarian, and composed by Hamid Motebassem.

He played the santour on the album "Morgenstund" by Schiller (band), which reached the prize of the first place on the official German album charts.

Also, Saraei composed and arranged several works, such as "Gahi, Segahi" (vocaled by Mohammad Motamedi ), a Persian traditional music album. His second album as a composer, "In Sare Sodaei" was an instrumental project with Pejman Hadadi.

As a Santour Soloist he has performed several concerts in Iran and several music festivals in Switzerland, China, and France with the Eshtiagh Orchestra (vocaled by Alireza Ghorbani)

Pouya Saraei has conducted the Komitas State Conservatory of Yerevan.

Works of Saraei and a number of young Iranian composers were showcased in an exhibition during the Vienna International Book Fair.

He holds his PhD in art studies from Tehran University and is Professor and Maestro at Tehran University of Art, University of Tehran, and Islamic Azad University and teaches several courses such as: santour, sight reading, history of music, stage performance, orchestration, organology, analysis of music, philosophy of music and music theory at the levels of bachelor's and master's degree.

He is on the Scientific Editorial board of the Mehregani Magazine and has written many articles and critic reviews. He has also published and presented lectures at international and domestic conferences such as Iran’s Academy of Arts and Encyclopaedia Islamica.

Awards

Discography 
 Ey jane jan bi man maro Vocaled by Homayoun Shajarian
 In the Name of the Red Rose vocaled by Salar Aghili 
 "As Far as Possible" on Modes (Soloist) Released by Navona Records
 Gahi segahi (Composer) vocaled by Mohammad Motamedi
 In Sare Sodaei (Composer) with Pejman Hadadi
 Aeene Farzanegi (Arranger and Composer) vocaled by Salar Aghili
 Bahaare Delkash vocaled by Salar Aghili
 Chakad e Honar (Arranger and Composer) vocaled by Ali Zand Vakili
 Shamsozzoha (Arranger and Composer) vocaled by Hesamoddin Seraj
 Janan (Composer)
 Sarandaz (Rearrangement) composed by Parviz Meshkatian
 Khayyam Recital composed by Peyman Soltani
 Dauntless (Arranger) vocaled by Mohammad Motamedi
 Hidden Found
 Hafez (Composer) vocaled by Sadeq Sheikhzadeh
 Shab-E Bi Setareh (Composer) vocaled by Ghaffar Zabeh
 Chaharmezrabe Esfahan(Arranger)
 The Legend of Your Face (Composer)
 The Rain (Composer)
 Moment (Composer)
 Morgenstund (Schiller album) composed by Schiller (band)
 Zaayandeh-Roud, Rhapsody for Symphonic Orchestra (Composer), Published by German Company, IDAGIO
 Desert, Santur with ensemble and orchestra (Composer), Published by East Music
 Intuition, Instrumental, Published by East Music
 My Iran, for symphonic orchestra (Composer), Published by East Music
 Roshana, Santur (Improvisation), Published by East Music
 Sensation, Santur (Improvisation), Published by East Music
 Nava, for symphonic orchestra, based on persian classical music, Published by Centaur Records

References

External links 
 

Living people
Iranian composers
Iranian santur players
Persian classical musicians
Musicians from Tehran
Iranian classical musicians
University of Tehran alumni
1983 births
Centaur Records artists
Naxos Records artists
Academic staff of Tehran University of Art